Key Markets is the eighth studio album by British post-punk duo Sleaford Mods. It was released on 24 July 2015, through Harbinger Sound. The tracks are critical of the UK government.

Reception

At Metacritic, which assigns a normalized rating out of 100 to reviews from mainstream critics, Key Markets received an average score of 81 based on twenty reviews, indicating "universal acclaim". It was one of the 19 records nominated for the IMPALA Album of the Year Award 2015.

Accolades

Track listing
 "Live Tonight" - 3:12
 "No One's Bothered" - 2:52
 "Bronx in a Six" - 3:35
 "Silly Me" - 3:15
 "Cunt Make It Up" - 2:31
 "Face To Faces" - 3:23
 "Arabia" - 3:01
 "In Quiet Streets" - 4:16
 "Tarantula Deadly Cargo" - 3:21
 "Rupert Trousers" - 3:13
 "Giddy on the Ciggies" - 4:15
 "The Blob" - 2:33

Charts

References

2015 albums
Sleaford Mods albums